"Renegade" is a 2007 single by ATB, featuring Heather Nova from his  album Trilogy.

Track listing

Renegade (Germany 12 single Release) 
01. "Renegade" (A&T Mix) (10:16)
02. "Renegade" (Ronski Speed Remix) (6:26)

Renegade (Germany Promo single Release) 
01. "Renegade" (Airplay Mix) (3:58) 
02. "Renegade" (A&T Mix) (10:16)
03. "Renegade" (Ronski Speed Remix) (6:26)

Renegade (Germany CD single Release) 
01. "Renegade" (Airplay Mix) (3:58) 
02. "Renegade" (A&T Mix) (10:16) 
03. "Renegade" (Ronski Speed Remix) (6:26)
04. "Renegade" (Video Clip) (3:58)

Renegade (US CD single Release) 
01. "Renegade" (A&T short mix) (4:26)
02. "Renegade" (Ronski Speed remix) (6:25)
03. "Renegade" (A&T mix) (10:17)
04. "Renegade" (Airplay mix) (3:57)
05. "Renegade" (Original album version) (5:37)

Charts

References

2007 singles
ATB songs
Songs written by André Tanneberger
Kontor Records singles
2007 songs